The Kumzhinskoye gas field is a condensate gas field in the Nenets Autonomous Okrug of Russia. It lies within the Nenets Nature Reserve, in the Pechora River delta. A fire in an exploratory well, in November 1980, led to the use of a peaceful nuclear explosion in 1981 as an attempt to control the fire. Despite this, hydrocarbon escape occurred after the 37kt explosion, needing further relief well drilling.

As of the mid-2010s, the licence to the gas field is held by CH Invest Company. The size of the field is 225km2, and is estimated to annually produce 3.2 billion cubic metres of natural gas and 170,000 tonnes a year of gas condensate.

See also
 Nuclear Explosions for the National Economy

References

Geography of Yamalo-Nenets Autonomous Okrug
Natural gas fields in Russia
Natural gas fields in the Arctic Ocean
Natural gas fields in the Soviet Union
Peaceful nuclear explosions